Malaryan (Mala Arayan, Malayarayar) is an extinct Dravidian language of Kerala and Tamil Nadu that was closely related to Malayalam.

References

Malayalam language